Ram Kadam (born 24 January 1972) is an Indian former social activist and politician, currently belonging to the Bharatiya Janata Party (BJP). He has been elected MLA for the Ghatkopar West Vidhan Sabha constituency in 2009, 2014, and 2019.He is one of the best youth face of BJP. .

Political career 

Kadam joined MNS in 2009 and was elected as MLA of Ghatkopar West. In 2014, he left MNS and joined Bharatiya Janata Party & fought 2014 Vidhansabha elections of BJP ticket. He secured a handsome victory. In June 2019, Kadam said “Devendra Fadnavis would be the next CM of Maharashtra” after rumblings from alliance partner. He won the Vidhan Sabha election in October 2019. 

When he became MLA for the first time in 2009, as a member of the MNS party, he was suspended for 4 years from the assembly on its opening day. He opposed  Abu Asim Azmi of Samajwadi Party taking the oath in Hindi, and assaulted Azmi. Kadam left MNS in 2014 and joined BJP.

Social service 
He started  free 'odomos' distribution to watchmen, liftmen working in night shifts in Mumbai. He has also organized pilgrimage tour to Tirupati and driving classes for youngsters registering as first time voters.

Kashi Pilgrimage 
He will organize free pilgrimage tour to Kashi for 51,000 elderly people. In past also, he has organized pilgrimage tours of approximately 175,000 people to Kashi, Ajmer Sharif, Palitana, Nashik Shirdi.

Dahi Handis 
He organized Dahi Handis with highest prize in Mumbai. His Dahi Handi events are always visited by Bollywood stars like Ranveer Singh, Arjun Rampal and Neha Dhupia in the past.

Jalyukta Shivir 
He is instrumental in bringing water trains Jaldoot to Latur during 2015 drought. He undertook several works of Jalyukta Shivir, He is one of the best youth face .

References

External links 
https://web.archive.org/web/20111006163208/https://www.manase.org/en/home_vs2009.php
http://news.rediff.com/report/2009/nov/09/four-mns-mla-suspended-for-assaulting-azmi.htm
https://web.archive.org/web/20091112093220/http://www.hindustantimes.com/Azmi-attacked-over-Hindi-oath-four-MNS-members-suspended/H1-Article1-474547.aspx
http://www.ramkadam.in
Twitter Account

Marathi politicians
Living people
Maharashtra Navnirman Sena politicians
Maharashtra MLAs 2009–2014
1972 births
Maharashtra MLAs 2014–2019
People from Mumbai Suburban district
People from Latur
Bharatiya Janata Party politicians from Maharashtra